Michael Humphreys may refer to:

Michael Humphreys (MP) (died 1626), MP for Dorchester, England
Michael Conner Humphreys (born 1985), American actor
Mike Humphreys (born 1967), American Major League Baseball player

See also
Humphreys (surname)